Amirali Ghasemi (Persian: امیرعلی قاسمی) is an Iranian independent curator, media artist, and graphic designer. He is the founder and director of Parkingallery, an art space in Tehran that has established itself as an accessible platform for young Iranian contemporary artists. He has worked at both art production and curating with the intention of showing aspects of Contemporary art in Iran that do not fall into the trope of what he calls, ‘'Chador art'’ or stereotypes of life in Iran packaged for foreign consumption.

Early life and education

Amirali Ghasemi was born in Tehran into a cultural environment. His grandparents published Arash, a political and cultural commentary magazine in the 1960s, while his parents work in journalism and social communication. Amirali studied graphic design at Islamic Azad University Central Tehran Branch receiving a BFA in 2004 and pursued further studies at the Institute for Art in Context at the Universität der Künste in Berlin.

Work

Art works 
Amirali Ghasemi's best known work is his 2006 piece, Tehran Remixed : Party series, Ghassemi expressed through a series of photographs of a side of Tehran life different from what he felt were prejudicial images often produced in international media on a mass scale. The series is an "intimate, real-life" depiction of party culture and social life in private lives of Iranian youth. Ghasemi masked faces so that Iran Reformists could not use his images as an example of how Iranian society was progressing and at the same time prevented the conservatives from using his work to clamp down on what they perceived to be un-Islamic activities.

Curating 
In 1998, Ghassemi converted his parents' garage into an art studio which over the years transformed to "a workshop space, then a gallery, with turns as a catwalk, lecture hall, and screening space" and finally Parkingallery that quickly became an "energetic hub" in Tehran's art scene. In 2002, an online presence was established to showcase the works of young Iranian contemporary artists. In 2014 the physical space was closed but the gallery has continued to exist as an online resource. In the summer of 2014, Ghasemi co-founded New Media Society, a project space, library and video archive in downtown Tehran.

In 2008, Amirali Ghasemi along with Serhat Köksal organized Urban Jealousy, the 1st International Roaming Biennial of Tehran an itinerant exhibition that drew considerable attention. The same year, Ghasemi was invited to organize an exhibition of contemporary Iranian art at Culturcentrum Bruges in Belgium. Faced with such an important curatorial project Ghasemi found it necessary to challenge clichés and bypass the stereotypical exhibition of Iranian art created and intended for export. Iran & Co presented 11 emerging artists in a performance/exhibition project. The premise of the project by Ghasemi's team was to create a company, Iran & Co that operated as a business that ordered Iranian art from abroad and had it produced there in the manner that artists from wealthier countries have regularly worked with craftsmen or technicians from underdeveloped countries. Of course, it was the other way round in Bruges, Antwerp and London where Iran & Co presented technicians and artists from economically strong countries who created and produced work for Iranian artists. In this manner, Iran & Co departed from the so-called "Iran Boom" that since, 2005-2006 led to hundreds of exhibitions and publications dealing with art from Iran and the Middle East.

Bibliography
Dewilde, Michel (2011) "Looking beyond the horizon, Iran & co, 24 October-2 November 2010" in Art Tomorrow. Issue 3. Tehran: Publisher Nazar
Issa, Rose and Bhabha, Homi Eds. (2009) Iranian Photography Now. Berlin: Hatje Cantz
Karimi, Pamela (Spring 2010) "When global art meanders on a magic carpet: A Conversation on Tehran’s Roaming Biennial“ in The Arab Studies Journal. Washington, D.C.: Vol.18, No.1. p. 294
Khatib, Lina (2012) Image Politics in the Middle East: The Role of the Visual in Political Struggle. London: I.B.Tauris
Orlotti, Marianna (15 April 2015) "Iran & Co. an Iranian Curator Diaries". Curate Archive
Zanganeh, L.A. (2006) My Sister, Guard Your Veil; My Brother, Guard Your Eyes: Uncensored Iranian Voices. Boston: Beacon Press, p. 107

References

External links 
 Parkingallery website
 Artist website

Iranian photographers
New media artists
1980 births
Living people